Downtown Butler Historic District is a national historic district located at Butler, DeKalb County, Indiana.  The district encompasses 30 contributing buildings in the central business district of Butler. The district developed between about 1860 and 1950, and includes notable examples of Italianate and Early Commercial style architecture.  Notable buildings include the Butler Carnegie Library (1916), Marshall Clothing Company, Old Dimestore (1863), First National Bank Building (1913), Butler Hotel (1914), Oberlin Building (1907), Towne Hardware / Broadway Cafe Buildings (1880s), Thompson Block (1903), and Mutzfeld Building (1912).

It was added to the National Register of Historic Places in 2001.

References

External links

Historic districts on the National Register of Historic Places in Indiana
Italianate architecture in Indiana
Historic districts in DeKalb County, Indiana
National Register of Historic Places in DeKalb County, Indiana
2001 establishments in Indiana